Xu Qi (Chinese: 许琦; born 9 March 1992) is a Chinese football player.

Club career
In 2011, Xu Qi started his professional footballer career with Shanghai Shenhua in the Chinese Super League.  He would eventually make his league debut for Shanghai Shenhua on 14 July 2012 in a game against Beijing Guoan, coming on as a substitute for Jiang Kun in the 70th minute.

Club career statistics 
Statistics accurate as of match played 29 November 2015.

References

1992 births
Living people
Chinese footballers
Footballers from Shanghai
Shanghai Shenhua F.C. players
Jiangxi Beidamen F.C. players
Chinese Super League players
Association football midfielders